Comet was launched in 1791 at Rotherhithe. At the outbreak of war with France, she briefly became a privateer before the British East India Company (EIC) chartered her for one voyage to bring back sugar, saltpeter, and other goods from Bengal. Between 1812 and 1821 she made three voyages as a whaler in the British southern whale fishery . Then between 1823 and 1840 she became a whaler based in Hull, whaling in the northern whale fishery. She returned to trade in 1841 and was lost on 1 December 1843 homeward bound from Quebec.

Career

Merchantman
Comet first appeared in Lloyd's Register (LR) in 1791 with S.Baker, master, B.Daubuz, owner, and trade London–Leghorn. Captain Sampson Baker acquired a letter of marque on 11 April 1793. The size of her crew suggests that the intent was to cruize as a privateer. Not long after, the EIC chartered Comet and had Young measure her in 1794. Lloyd's Register for 1794 showed her trade changing from London–Straits [of Gibraltar] to London–Bengal.

EIC voyage (1794–1795): Baker sailed from Gravesend on 17 June 1794, bound for Bengal and Madras. Comet arrived at Calcutta on 15 November. Homeward bound she was at Kedgeree on 29 January 1795 and Saugor on 18 February. She was at Madras on 4 March and reached Saint Helena on 24 May. She stopped at the River Shannon on 13 September, and arrived back at Deptford on 18 October.

After her return, Comet became a West Indiaman, with Captain Anthony Hooper acquiring a letter of marque on 6 September 1797. On 6 March 1798 Lloyd's List (LL) reported that the French privateer Garonne had captured Comet, Hooper, master, as Comet was sailing from Martinique to London. Garonne also captured Alert, Bligh, master, which was sailing from St Ubes to Limerick. Garonne put Hooper and Bligh aboard Minerva, Gardner, master, which carried them into Falmouth. On 30 Marc Lloyd's List reported that Comet had been carried into Rochefort. Comet returned to British ownership by means that are currently unclear. A Comet, Peterson, master, arrived at Gravesend on 20 August 1800. She may have returned as a cartel. Then Comet, Murcheson, master, sailed from Gravesend for Demerara on 17 November.

LL reported on 18 December 1801 that Comet, Murcheson, master, and Themis, Douglas, master, had run into each other near Portsmouth. Comet was sailing from London to Demerara, and Themis was sailing from London to Grenada. Comet lost her mizzenmast and had her quarters stove in.

Southern Whale Fishery
1st whaling voyage (1812–1815): Captain Abel Scurr sailed from Hull on 3 September 1812, bound for Peru and the Galapagos.  By one report, Comet had two captains Scurr: was the "fighting captain" and Duke (or Dunn), was the "whaling captain". Comet arrived off the coast of Chile only to undergo detention between January 1813 and March 1814 at Talcahuano. The detention came at the hand of the Patriots, the independence fighter opposing the Spanish loyalists. After her release, Comet went whaling at the Galapagos Islands and elsewhere in the region. Captain Scurr died on 17 June 1815; Comet arrived at Callao the next day. Comet sailed for home on 15 July, sailing via Cape Horn and Saint Helena.

Comet, Duke, master, returned to England on 4 December 1815 with 350 casks of oil plus fins from 38 whales plus oil from 873 Galapagos turtles, in all 115 tons of oil. Her cargo was worth about £7,000.

Before sailing on her second whaling voyage, Comet, Captain Sugden, sailed to the West Indies. Lloyd's List reported on 11 March 1817 that Comet, Sugden, master, had arrived at Dominica from Hull. She arrived back at Gravesend on 25 May.

Comet, Sugden, master, also sailed to Russia. On 30 August 1817 she was at Petersburg. She returned to Gravesend on 26 October .

2nd whaling voyage (1818–1819): Comet was reported to be at Portsmouth on 26 March 1818, bound for the South Seas. By another account, Comet, Phipps, master, sailed from England on 3 April 1818. He returned on 11 June 1819 with 350 casks plus fins, or 175 tons train oil.

3rd whaling voyage (1819–1821): Captain Stewart (or Steward) sailed from Deal for the South Seas on 3 November 1819, having come from Hull. Comet returned to England on 13 November 1821 with 250 casks (117 tuns) of whale oil, plus fins.

Northern Whale Fishery
On her return from the South Seas, Comet made a voyage to Russia, and then became a whaler in the Northern Whale Fishery.

For 18 years between 1823 and 1840 Comet made one voyage a year to the Northern Whale Fishery. The following data is from Coltish:

Merchantman
After several disappointing years as a whaler, her owners shifted her employment to mercantile trade.

Fate
Comet ran aground on 1 December 1843 on the Haisborough Sands, in the North Sea off the coast of Norfolk; her crew abandoned her. She had been on a voyage from Quebec City to Hull. Comet was refloated the next day and beached at Great Yarmouth, Norfolk.

The data for Comet in Lloyd's Register for 1843 is unchanged from 1842, with the exception of the annotation "LOST".

Notes

Citations

References
 
 
 
 
 
 

1791 ships
Age of Sail merchant ships of England
Captured ships
Ships built in Rotherhithe
Maritime incidents in December 1843
Whaling ships